Buttonquail or hemipodes are members of a small family of birds, Turnicidae, which resemble, but are unrelated to, the quails of Phasianidae. They inhabit warm grasslands in Asia, Africa, Europe, and Australia. There are 18 species in two genera, with most species placed in the genus Turnix and a single species in the genus Ortyxelos.

Buttonquails are small, drab, running birds, which avoid flying. The female is the more richly colored of the sexes. While the quail-plover is thought to be monogamous, Turnix buttonquails are sequentially polyandrous; both sexes cooperate in building a nest in the earth, but normally only the male incubates the eggs and tends the young, while the female may go on to mate with other males.

Taxonomy
The genus Turnix was introduced in 1791 by French naturalist in Pierre Bonnaterre. The genus name is an abbreviation of the genus Coturnix. The type species was subsequently designated as the common buttonquail. 

The buttonquail family, Turnicidae, was introduced in 1840 by the English zoologist George Robert Gray. The buttonquails were traditionally placed in Gruiformes or Galliformes (the crane and pheasant orders).  The Sibley-Ahlquist taxonomy elevated them to ordinal status as the Turniciformes and basal to other Neoaves either because their accelerated rate of molecular evolution exceeded the limits of sensitivity of DNA-DNA hybridization or because the authors did not perform the appropriate pairwise comparisons or both.  Morphological, DNA-DNA hybridization and sequence data indicate that turnicids correctly belong to the shorebirds (Charadriiformes). They seem to be an ancient group among these, as indicated by the buttonquail-like Early Oligocene fossil Turnipax and the collected molecular data.

Description
The buttonquails are a group of small terrestrial birds. They superficially resemble the true quails of the genus Coturnix, but differ from them in lacking a hind toe and a crop. The females of this family also possess a unique vocal organ created by an enlarged trachea and inflatable bulb in the esophagus, which they use to produce a booming call.

Breeding
Buttonquails are unusual in that females are serially polyandrous. The nest is a scape on the ground often near overhanging vegetation. The female lays a clutch of 4 or 5 eggs and then looks for a new mate. The male incubates the eggs which hatch synchronously after 12 to 15 days. The precocial chicks leave the nest soon after hatching and are cared for by the male. They can fly at two weeks of age and become independent at four weeks. For the smaller species sexual maturity is reached at three months.

Species
Family: Turnicidae
 Genus: Ortyxelos
 Quail-plover, Ortyxelos meiffrenii
 Genus: Turnix
 Common buttonquail, Turnix sylvaticus
 Tawitawi small buttonquail, Turnix sylvaticus suluensis (extinct: mid-20th century)
 Andalusian hemipode, Turnix sylvaticus sylvaticus (possibly extinct: late 20th century?)
 Red-backed buttonquail, Turnix maculosus
 Fynbos buttonquail, Turnix hottentottus
 Black-rumped buttonquail, Turnix nanus
 Yellow-legged buttonquail, Turnix tanki
 Spotted buttonquail, Turnix ocellatus
 Barred buttonquail, Turnix suscitator
 Madagascar buttonquail, Turnix nigricollis
 Black-breasted buttonquail, Turnix melanogaster
 Chestnut-backed buttonquail, Turnix castanotus
 Buff-breasted buttonquail, Turnix olivii
 Painted buttonquail, Turnix varius
 Abrolhos painted buttonquail, Turnix varius scintillans
 New Caledonian buttonquail, Turnix novaecaledoniae (possibly extinct: early 20th century)
 Worcester's buttonquail, Turnix worcesteri
 Sumba buttonquail, Turnix everetti
 Red-chested buttonquail, Turnix pyrrhothorax
 Little buttonquail, Turnix velox

Gallery

References

 Sibley, Charles Gald & Ahlquist, Jon Edward (1990): Phylogeny and classification of birds. Yale University Press, New Haven, Conn.

External links

Buttonquail videos on the Internet Bird Collection

Extant Rupelian first appearances
Charadriiformes
Taxa named by George Robert Gray
Bird families